The genus Megachile is a cosmopolitan group of solitary bees, often called leafcutter bees or leafcutting bees; it also includes the called resin bees and mortar bees.  While other genera within the family Megachilidae may chew leaves or petals into fragments to build their nests, certain species within Megachile neatly cut pieces of leaves or petals, hence their common name.  This is one of the largest genera of bees, with more than 1500 species in over 50 subgenera. The alfalfa leafcutter bee (Megachile rotundata) is managed on a commercial scale for crop pollination, and has been introduced by humans to various regions around the world.

Ecology 

Nests are sometimes constructed within hollow twigs or other similarly constricted natural cavities, but often are in burrows in the ground.  Nests are typically composed of single long columns of cells, the cells being sequentially constructed from the deepest portion of the tunnel outwards. The female places an egg in each cell with a supply of food, generally pollen, sometimes mixed with nectar. She builds a cap and walls off the cell. The larva hatches from the egg and consumes the food supply. After moulting a few times, it spins a cocoon and pupates, often after several months of hibernation as a prepupa. It emerges from the nest as an adult. Males, which are typically smaller and emerge in advance of females, die shortly after mating, but females survive for another few weeks, during which time they build new nests. Numerous families of wasps and bees parasitize Megachile nests, including Gasteruptiidae, Leucospidae, Sapygidae, and various kleptoparasitic megachilids, such as the closely related genus Coelioxys. Megachile rotundata and Megachile campanulae are among of the first insects documented in scientific literature to use synthetic materials for making nests.

Many Megachile species use cut leaves to line the cells of their nests. It is thought that the leaf discs help prevent the desiccation of the larva's food supply. Various species in the genus, especially those in the subgenus Chalicodoma and related groups, do not use cut leaves to line the cells, but instead use fairly dry plant resin, which they carry in their mandibles. The subgenus Chalicodoma includes the world's largest bee, Megachile pluto, as well as one of the largest megachilids in the United States, the recently introduced Asian species, Megachile sculpturalis.

Some Megachile species have no lobe (arolia) between their claws, thus are unable to climb smooth walls or glass.

Diversity
The genus Megachile contains 56 subgenera with 1520 recognized species. See also the list of Megachile species.

Notable subgenera:
 Callomegachile
 Chalicodoma
 Chelostomoides

Notable species:
 Megachile albisecta (Klug, 1817)
 Megachile campanulae, bellflower resin bee
 Megachile fidelis, faithful leafcutting bee
 Megachile perihirta, western leafcutting bee
 Megachile pluto, the largest bee in the world
 Megachile rotundata, alfalfa leafcutter bee
 Megachile rubi
 Megachile sculpturalis, giant resin bee
 Megachile texana, Texas leafcutter bee

Gallery

References

 , 2006: A New Subgenus of Megachile from Borneo with Arolia (Hymenoptera: Megachilidae). American Museum Novitates 3505 : 1-12. . Full article: .
 , 2006: The subgenus Megachile (Dasymegachile) Mitchell with special reference to the Argentine species (Hymenoptera: Megachilidae). Neotropical Entomology 35 (6): 791-802. Abstract and full article: .
 ;  2009: Cladistic analysis of Megachile (Chrysosarus) Mitchell and revalidation of Megachile (Dactylomegachile) Mitchell (Hymenoptera, Megachilidae). Zootaxa, 2284: 48-62. Abstract & excerpt
 , 2008: A new species of Megachile (Eutricharaea) from western Saudi Arabia related to Megachile walkeri (Hymenoptera: Megachilidae). Acta Entomologica Slovenica 16(2).
Zootaxa, 3267: 55–64. Preview
 , 2005: A study on the genus Megachile Latreille from China with descriptions of fourteen new species (Apoidea: Megachilidae). Acta Zootaxonomica Sinica 30 (1): 155-165.

External links

Megachile Identification Guide (female) discoverlife.org
Megachile Identification Guide (male) discoverlife.org
List of Species discoverlife.org
Worldwide Species Map discoverlife.org

 
Bee genera